General William Carr Beresford, 1st Viscount Beresford, 1st Marquis of Campo Maior,  (2 October 1768 – 8 January 1854) was an Anglo-Irish soldier and politician. A general in the British Army and a Marshal in the Portuguese Army, he fought alongside The Duke of Wellington in the Peninsular War and held the office of Master-General of the Ordnance in 1828 in Wellington's first ministry. He led the 1806 failed British invasion of Buenos Aires.

Background
Beresford was the illegitimate son of the 1st Marquess of Waterford. He was the brother of Admiral Sir John Beresford, 1st Baronet (who was also illegitimate), and the half-brother of the 2nd Marquess of Waterford, Archbishop Lord John Beresford and General Lord George Beresford.

Early campaign experience

Beresford entered the British Army in 1785 as an ensign in the 6th Regiment of Foot and the next year he was blinded in one eye due to an incident with a musket. He remained in the service being promoted to captain by 1791 with the 69th Regiment of Foot. He distinguished himself at Toulon (1793), in Egypt (1799–1803) and in South Africa (1805). From there crossed the South Atlantic to South America to invade the River Plate region (now Argentina), with a small British force of 1,500 men, departing on 14April 1806. Following his move to Cape Town in Cape Colony, Beresford, spurred on by Home Popham, R.N. (later Rear Admiral Sir Home Popham), decided to attack Buenos Aires in Spanish South America. No attempt was made to gain authorization from the Crown for this undertaking. In the invasion of the River Plate, Buenos Aires was occupied for 46 days. However, the British force could not maintain itself against the army gathered by Santiago de Liniers. After a relentless two-day fight with the Buenos Aires and Montevideo militias between 10 and 12 August 1806, the British were defeated and forced to capitulate. Beresford had to surrender, remaining prisoner for six months; in the end, he managed to escape and arrived in England in 1807.

Peninsular War

Commander in Chief of the Portuguese Army
In that same year Beresford was sent to Madeira, which he occupied in name of the Queen of Portugal, remaining there for six months as Governor and Commander in Chief. The exiled Portuguese Government in Rio de Janeiro, Brazil, whereto the Portuguese Royal Family had set up a Court in exile, realised the necessity of appointing a commander-in-chief capable of training, equipping and disciplining the demoralised Portuguese Royal Army. The Portuguese government asked Britain to appoint Arthur Wellesley to this role, Wellesley indicated he could not do the role justice due to his prior engagements and recommended Beresford. He was appointed Marshal and Commander in Chief of the Army by Decree of 7 March 1809 and took the command on 15th of the same month. At that time, French general Marshal Soult had already crossed into Portugal where he occupied Porto. Beresford quickly overhauled the Portuguese forces, bringing them in line with British discipline and organization, and from the General Headquarters (then at the Largo do Calhariz), he dispatched many "daily orders" altering points of the infantry ordnance, creating a general command of artillery, establishing the separation of the battalions, firing incompetent or corrupt officers and promoting or appointing appropriate replacements.

On campaign
On 22 April 1809 Sir Arthur Wellesley, later Duke of Wellington, disembarked in Lisbon, and took over the command of all the Anglo-Portuguese troops whereupon Beresford was nominated Marshal General of the Portuguese Army. The allied armies marched to the North. Wellington moved from Coimbra directly to Porto, which he entered on 12 May, and Beresford marched through the Province of Beira, arriving that same day at the banks of the Douro river, in the area of Lamego. Wellington's troops made a forced crossing of the Douro and defeated the French, forcing Marshal Soult to withdraw from Porto. Soult was outnumbered and expelled from Portugal; the positioning of Beresford's forces compelled the French to leave Portugal by the poor roads through Montalegre. They managed to cross the border only after sacrificing their artillery and baggage, and faced numerous difficulties during the evacuation.

The Second French Invasion of Portugal was defeated and the allied armies moved back to the South, the British concentrating at Abrantes and the Portuguese at Castelo Branco. With the intention of cooperating with the Spanish against Marshal Victor, the Anglo-Portuguese forces under Wellesley moved into Spain in the Talavera campaign while Beresford remained on the Águeda River covering the Spanish-Portuguese border.  After Wellesley's return, now as Viscount Wellington, following the Battle of Talavera, Beresford re-entered Portugal, where he distributed the army at various locations and established his General Headquarters in Lisbon.  From Lisbon he dispatched numerous orders and instructions for the reform of the Portuguese military.

In the same year (1809), and the one following he made tours of inspection of the corps that were found quartered in the various provinces and he corrected any defects he noticed and established rules for the functioning of the different branches of the military service. In this way he improved the functioning of the Portuguese Army so that they might face the forces of Napoleon invading the country for the third time. The beneficial results of his efforts were proven at the campaign against Marshal Masséna in particular at the Battle of Buçaco on 27September 1810 where the Portuguese troops played a prominent part, and also in the defence of the Lines of Torres Vedras).

The most notable action in which Beresford held independent command occurred in 1811 when a combined Anglo-Portuguese and Spanish army under his command, intercepted a French army commanded by Marshal Soult, who had been ordered by Marshal Auguste de Marmont to move to protect the important Spanish fortress-city of Badajoz. As the French forces retreated from the Lines of Torres Vedras, Beresford marched towards Badajoz, which he laid siege to. Having, however, received notice that Soult was approaching, he lifted the siege and posted his army at Albuera in a defensive position. There he defeated the French forces on 16 May 1811. After the bloody Battle of Albuera the French were forced to retreat, though the siege of Badajoz had to be subsequently abandoned. Meanwhile, on 13 May 1811, he was created Count of Trancoso in Portugal by decree of Prince Regent John.

At the beginning of July 1811, Beresford was again in Lisbon, but he was subjected to fits of "nervous breakdowns", as described by Brigadier D'Urban, quarter master general of the Portuguese Army. He recuperated in February 1812 and then joined Wellington in his investment of Ciudad Rodrigo. Once the fortified town had fallen, he went with the army to Alentejo, and participated in the Anglo-Portuguese Siege of Badajoz. After Badajoz had been stormed, along with Wellington he once again took up position on the Águeda, and from there launched the Salamanca campaign. On 22 July 1812, the important Battle of Salamanca was fought, giving the Anglo-Portuguese forces a decisive victory over the French under Marshal Marmont. In the battle Beresford was badly wounded under his left breast while ordering the advance of one of the Portuguese brigades.

He retired to Lisbon, had bouts of fever and was half incapacitated for several months until May of the next year (1813). Meanwhile, he was also created Marquis of Campo Maior in Portugal by Prince Regent John on 17 December 1812. In March he was confirmed as second in command of the Allied Army and re-joined the campaigning army before assisting in the liberation of Spain by the British and Portuguese armies.

In the invasion of France, he assisted Wellington at the command of a corps and was hailed as the liberator of Bordeaux. He fought in France at Toulouse, the last clash of the Peninsular War.  During that conflict he had been present at the battles of A Coruña, Busaco, Albuera, Badajoz, Salamanca, Vittoria, the Pyrenees, Nivelle, Nive, Orthez and Toulouse.  His Peninsular Gold Medal had seven clasps - only the Duke of Wellington, with nine clasps, had more to his medal.

Later career

After peace was declared he went to England on leave and came back again to Lisbon to reassume the command of the Portuguese Army. He did not limit himself, however, to that role, and intended to intervene in the general politics of the country, from this he came into conflict with the Regency. He then determined to go to the Court in Rio de Janeiro. He departed there in August 1815 and returned in September 1816, invested with wider powers than the ones which he had previously enjoyed. Beresford took a high hand in his dealings with Gomes Freire de Andrade (1817) and, put into a difficult situation, he returned to Brazil, obtaining from John VI the confirmation of the powers he had already attained, which he desired to see amplified.

When he returned to Portugal, the Liberal Revolution of 1820 intervened; the British officers, for the most part, had been discharged, and the government would not even consent that Beresford could disembark.
He was made Governor of Jersey in 1821 and held the position till 1854, the last titular Governor of Jersey; since his death the Crown has been represented in Jersey by the Lieutenant Governor of Jersey.

He was given the colonelcy of three regiments in succession. He was Colonel of the 69th (South Lincolnshire) Regiment of Foot from 1807 to 1819, the 88th Regiment of Foot (Connaught Rangers) from 1819 to 1823 and the 16th (Bedfordshire) Regiment from 1823 until his death. Briefly returning to Portugal in 1827 at the request of the Regent, Infanta Isabel Maria of Braganza, he gave up his ambitions because of the resistance he encountered among the new Portuguese elite and returned to Britain.

In the 1840s, Beresford expanded the Bedgebury Estate near Goudhurst, Kent. He built the hamlet of Kilndown to the north west of Bedgebury.

Legacy

Napier, in his History of the Peninsular War, severely criticized the tactics of Beresford at the Battle of Albuera, which gave origin to a heated correspondence between the Marshal and the historian. The published letters of Beresford which are mentioned below refer to this controversy. Wellington himself had no illusions over Beresford's ability as a General, but he appreciated his abilities as a military organizer, and recommended that Beresford should take command if he himself were disabled. He published: Strictures on Certain Passages of L. Col. Napier's History of Peninsular War; Further Strictures; Refutation of Col. Napier's Justification, London, 1831–1834, 3 Vol.; Letter to Charles Edward Long, Esq. on the Extracts Recently Published from the Ms. Journal and Private Correspondence of the Late Lieut-Gen. R. B. Long, London, John Murray, 1833; A Second Letter to Charles Edward Long, Esq. on the Ms. Journal and Private Correspondence of the Late Lieut. General R. B. Long (1834). Also of interest is the Colecção das Ordens do Dia (Collection of Orders of the Day) produced by Beresford's general headquarters nos Anos de 1809 a 1823 (for the years 1809 to 1823), Lisbon, 13 Vol. (at the Library of the English Institute of the University of Coimbra).

 

As a reward for his services in the fight against the French he was raised to the peerage as Baron Beresford, of Albuera and Dungarvan in the County of Waterford, on 3 May 1814. On 28 March 1823 he was further honoured when he was made Viscount Beresford, of Beresford in the County of Stafford. Beside many national and foreign honours and decorations he received the Grand Cross of the Portuguese Order of the Tower and Sword.  Some authors infer that he also had the title of 1st Duke of Elvas; but no document recording the granting this title is extant. Beresford County, New South Wales, Australia was named in his honour.

He is the namesake of Beresford, New Brunswick.

Parliament 
Beresford was Member of Parliament (MP) for County Waterford from a by-election on 28 June 1811 to 25 April 1814, just before being raised to his peerage.

He was sworn of the Privy Council in 1821.

Family
Lord Beresford married his first cousin the Honourable Louisa, widow of Thomas Hope and daughter of William Beresford, 1st Baron Decies and Elizabeth Fitzgibbon, in 1832. The marriage was childless. She died in July 1851. Lord Beresford died in January 1854, aged 85. The barony and viscountcy became extinct on his death. His estates were passed on to his stepson, Alexander Beresford Hope. Beresford's Portuguese titles were not renewed, although his nephews continued using them.

Arms

See also
 List of Marquesses in Portugal
 List of Countships in Portugal
 Beresford Gate
 Beresford Square

References

Sources

 The Fatal Hill: The Allied Campaign under Beresford in Southern Spain in 1811, Mark Sunderland, Thompson Publishing, London 2002, Long Review, 
 Henriques, Mendo Castro, Salamanca – 1812 Companheiros de Honra, Lisboa, 2006, 2nd edition,
 Zúquete, Afonso Eduardo Martins, Nobreza de Portugal e do Brasil (3 Volumes), Volume Second, p. 474-7, Lisbon, 1960.

External links

 
 Genealogical information on the Marquesses of Campo Maior
 Genealogical information on the Counts of Trancoso

|-

|-

|-

|-

|-

|-

|-

1768 births
1854 deaths
Spanish captain generals
Field marshals of Portugal
British Army generals
British Army personnel of the French Revolutionary Wars
British Army commanders of the Napoleonic Wars
British Army personnel of the Peninsular War
Knights Grand Cross of the Order of the Bath
Viscounts in the Peerage of the United Kingdom
Governors of Jersey
Royal Warwickshire Fusiliers officers
69th Regiment of Foot officers
Members of the Parliament of the United Kingdom for County Waterford constituencies (1801–1922)
UK MPs 1807–1812
UK MPs 1812–1818
UK MPs who were granted peerages
William
Recipients of the Army Gold Cross
People of the Peninsular War
British invasions of the River Plate
Grand Crosses of the Royal and Military Order of San Hermenegild
Laureate Cross of Saint Ferdinand
Members of the Privy Council of the United Kingdom
Peers of the United Kingdom created by George III
Peers of the United Kingdom created by George IV
British prisoners of war (Napoleonic Wars)